Fahad Belal Al-Salik (born April 30, 1991 in Medina, Saudi Arabia) is a Saudi Arabian professional basketball player.  He currently plays for Uhud Medina of the Saudi Premier League. 

He was a member of Saudi Arabia's national basketball team at the 2014 Asian Games in Incheon, South Korea. He was the match winner at Saudi Arabia's victory against India, where he scored a team high 17 points.

External links
 Asia-basket.com Profile
 Real GM Profile
 FIBA Profile

References

1991 births
Living people
Saudi Arabian men's basketball players
Point guards
People from Medina
Basketball players at the 2014 Asian Games
Asian Games competitors for Saudi Arabia
20th-century Saudi Arabian people
21st-century Saudi Arabian people